Compsolechia perlatella is a moth of the family Gelechiidae. It was described by Francis Walker in 1864. It is found in Amazonas, Brazil.

Adults are dark cupreous, the forewings with two oblique aeneous-cinereous (bronze-ash-gray) bands, one near the base, the other in the middle.

References

Moths described in 1864
Compsolechia